Joseph M. Tucci (born 1947 in Brooklyn, New York), more popularly known as Joe Tucci, is the former chairman of the board of directors, president and chief executive officer of EMC Corporation. Tucci was EMC's chairman since January 2006 and president and CEO since January 2001, one year after he joined the company as president and chief operating officer. As Dell have agreed and concluded the acquisition of EMC in 2016, Joe Tucci stepped down from leading EMC and the new formed Dell EMC entity.

Before joining EMC, Tucci directed the financial and operational rebirth of Wang Laboratories during six years as its chairman and CEO. Tucci is also a member of the President's Council of Advisors on Science and Technology (PCAST).

Tucci received his bachelor's degree in marketing from Manhattan College in 1969, and an MS in Business Policy from Columbia University.

While CEO of EMC, Tucci was known as an unflinching proponent of using noncompete agreements to stifle competitors.

He is currently serving as the chair of Bridge Growth Partners.

Compensation
While CEO of EMC in 2011, Joseph M. Tucci earned a total compensation of $13,238,857, which included a base salary of $1,000,000, a cash bonus of $2,140,869, stocks granted of $8,408,713, and options granted of $1,557,752.

References

External links
 About Joseph M. Tucci

American technology chief executives
Columbia Business School alumni
Dell EMC
Living people
Manhattan College alumni
1947 births